"Hommage to Lovey Dovey" is the debut single by South Korea boy group Speed. Speed is part of the Core Contents Media and was formed as a sub-unit of Co-Ed School and the all-male counterpart the  all female sub-unit known as 5dolls. The promotional single for the album was called "Lovey Dovey-Plus".

Release
In January 2012, the sub-units name, Speed was revealed along with the announcement that they would release the digital single "Lovey Dovey-Plus", a "hommage" track to T-ara's hit "Lovey-Dovey". T-ara ex-member Ryu Hwayoung and her twin sister Ryu Hyoyoung (from 5dolls) were featured in the music video. Speed followed the release of the single with two weeks of promotions on music shows.

Music and video

Music
Speed's agency, GM Contents Media requested to rearrange T-ara's "Lovey-Dovey" in their own style and participated in the arrangement with the permission of T-ara's agency, Core Contents Media resulting in the song "Lovey-Dovey Plus".

Background video
The music video for "Lovey-Dovey Plus" reminds us of Michael Jackson's "Billie Jean".  T-ara former member Ryu Hwayoung and her twin sister Ryu Hyoyoung (from 5dolls) were featured in the music video.

Track list

Release history

References

2012 singles
2012 songs